Lance Sergeant Joseph William Stones (1892 – 18 January 1917) was a British soldier during the First World War who was executed for cowardice. He later became the first Briton so executed to have his name added to a war memorial.

Background
Stones was born and grew up in Crook, County Durham, and worked as a miner before the war. When the war began in 1914 he volunteered to join the British Army, but was rejected because he was too short in height. By 1915 the army had lowered its requirements, and Stones joined the 19th Battalion, Durham Light Infantry in 1915. He was commended for his bravery several times, and fought in the Battle of the Somme.

Night of 26 November 1916 and subsequent military legal proceedings
The incident for which he was executed occurred in the trenches near Arras on 26 November 1916. According to his statement at his court martial, his officer, Lieutenant James Mundy, mortally wounded during an encounter with a German patrol approaching the British trenches, ordered him to go for help. Stones testified that he was unable to fire his rifle because its safety catch was on and the cover was over the breech, so he had jammed it across the trench and abandoned it to slow down what he took for a German raiding party entering the British line, whilst he withdrew to the rear seeking help. He was subsequently stopped by Brigade police further back attempting to outside the forward line trenches area.

In spite of Stones' statement as to the order that he had received, and one from his Commanding Officer that: "he is the last man I would have thought capable of any cowardly action", he was convicted of "shamefully casting away his rifle" in the face of the enemy, and sentenced to death. The General commanding the 106th (Infantry) Brigade, Brigadier-General H. O'Donnell, upheld the verdict and death sentence, in spite of his doubts about the quality of the evidence presented. On 11 January 1917 the matter was placed before Field Marshal Sir Douglas Haig as the Commander-in-Chief of the British Expeditionary Force, along with the files of 10 other men from the 35th Division whom had been tried and sentenced to death for desertion in the presence of the enemy in the same incident. Haig confirmed three of the death sentences (including Stones'), and effectively pardoned the remaining eight men.

Stones was executed at Roellecourt in France by a firing squad on 18 January 1917, alongside two Lance-Corporals, John McDonald and Peter Goggins, also of the 19th Battalion D.L.I., who had been similarly sentenced to death for casting away their rifles and abandoning their posts in the same affair. All three were transported to a field in a motor ambulance vehicle manacled and blindfolded, where upon arrival they were escorted from the vehicle and tied to three wooden posts fixed in the earth, and shot simultaneously by three separate firing squads of 12 men each from their regiment. The chaplain who prayed with them before their deaths remarked that he had never met three braver men. Stones' body was buried in the British military cemetery at Saint-Pol-sur-Ternoise.

Post-war events
Like many men executed for desertion in World War 1 in the British Army, Stones became a source of shame for his family, and his name was rarely mentioned. His great-nephew, Tom Stones, only discovered that he existed accidentally while researching his family tree, but later became prominent in the campaign for a Royal Pardon for Stones and the other servicemen executed for desertion during the First World War.

In 1997, Wear Valley Council took the then unprecedented decision to add Stones' name to the war memorial in Crook, after the Minister of State for the Armed Forces, John Reid, announced a government review of the cases of the men executed in World War 1 for desertion. Stones was officially pardoned in 2006 along with the 305 other British soldiers who had been similarly executed in the First World War.

See also
Harry Farr
Shot at Dawn Memorial

References

External links
Joseph William Stones (1890–1917) – Profile on Durham at War website
A Brave and Bold Soldier – Profile on Shot at Dawn website

1892 births
1917 deaths
Durham Light Infantry soldiers
British Army personnel executed during World War I
British Army personnel of World War I
British Army personnel who were court-martialled
Executed people from County Durham
People from Crook, County Durham
Deaths by firearm in France
Military personnel from County Durham